The Canada Foundation for Sustainable Development Technology Act (the Act) is a Government of Canada statute to establish a foundation called Sustainable Development Technology Canada to fund sustainable development technology. The federal department responsible for enforcing this Act is Natural Resources Canada.

The Act was passed in 2001.

References 

Environmental law in Canada
Natural Resources Canada
Sustainable technologies
Canadian federal legislation
Sustainability in Canada